Animahenasyon is an annual animation festival and competition held in the Philippines. Organized by the Animation Council of the Philippines, Inc. (ACPI), the festival features the animated works of veteran and novice Filipino animators.  Apart from the competition, the festival holds classes, seminars, workshops, and exhibits related to the animation profession.  It has the aim of harvesting the talent and creativity of Filipino cartoonists and animators.  It is considered as an annual celebration of the animation industry in the Philippines.

Etymology
The name "Animahenasyon" is the product after combining the Filipino-language words for "animation" and "imagination", namely animasyon and imahenasyon (also spelled as imahinasyon) respectively.  In English, the wordplay would result to "animagination".  The message of the term Animahenasyon indicated the goal of the Animation Council of the Philippines, Inc. to portray the image of the Philippines as a "nation of animators" internationally.

Purpose
In general, the aim of the Animahenasyon as a flagship project of the Animation Council of the Philippines, Inc. is for the Philippine animation festival to serve as a venue for Filipino animators in showcasing their ideas, and to be able to meet established animators in the industry and become inspired by them.  Another goal is to create a larger window of exposure of and awareness about the Filipino animation industry, including the industry’s contribution to the international entertainment field.  Animahenasyon taps on locally produced animation materials and content that can be promoted and marketed both within the Philippines and internationally.
In an effort to build an audience, awareness and development of original contents, ACPI organizes its flagship project Animahenasyon with the following additional objectives: to encourage potential animators to explore the opportunities available in the industry; to provide a location for exchanging ideas and possible business opportunities among animators, producers, and supporters of the industry; and to hold forums that will discuss and set the direction for the development of the industry.

Composition
The major parts of the Animahenasyon is the granting of the Lifetime Achievement Award and the Outstanding Emerging Artist in Animation Award. The screening of animated works for both amateur and professional divisions included different running time categories, namely the 1 to 5 minutes run, the 6 to 20 minutes run, the 21 to 60 minutes run, and finally the 60 minutes run – also known as full-animated feature.  Other categories included the presentation of music videos, title sequences, public information, demonstration reels, and television series.  For the exhibitions, the categories are full-length animation, special citation, and the presentation of past Animahenasyon winners.

Lifetime achievement awardees
In 2007, the Lifetime Achievement award was given to Filipino cartoonist, Larry Alcala.  2008, Severino "Nonoy" Marcelo, a Filipino cartoonist, 2009, Jose Zabala Santos also a cartoonist, 2010, the Lifetime Achievement award is for Roxlee, a cartoonist and filmmaker from Naga City, and last year's Gerry Garcia, a cartoonist and animator for 2011 Lifetime Achievement Awardee.

Festivals

Animahenasyon Finalists and Winners

Animahenasyon 2010 Winners

Animahenasyon 2016 Winners

Animahenasyon 2017 Finalists

Animahenasyon 2018 Finalists

Animahenasyon 2019 Finalists

Animahenasyon 2020 Finalists

Source:

See also
 List of animation awards
 Filipino cartoon and animation

References

External links
Animahenasyon: The Philippine Animation Festival official website
Animation Council of the Philippines official website

Animation awards
Philippine animation
Animation film festivals
Annual events in the Philippines
Film festivals in the Philippines
Film festivals established in 2007
Student film festivals